Kempston Academy (formerly 'Hastingsbury Upper School and Community College', 'Hastingsbury Business and Enterprise College' and then 'Kempston Challenger Academy') is a mixed secondary school and sixth form located on Hill Rise in Kempston, Bedfordshire, England. The school forms part of an educational campus which also includes a Child Development Centre and Ridgeway School.

History
The school was originally named Hastingsbury Upper School and Community College, and later became a Business and Enterprise College. It was previously an upper school, teaching children from the age of 13 to 18. It was also a foundation school administered by Bedford Borough Council. Hastingsbury converted to academy status November 2015 and is now sponsored by the Challenger multi-academy trust. The school was later renamed Kempston Challenger Academy. The school extended its lower age range in 2017 and is now a secondary school. In May 2022 the school was transferred to the Chiltern Learning Trust. The school is now known as Kempston Academy.

Academics
Kempston Academy offers GCSEs and BTECs as programmes of study. Pupils in the sixth form can choose to study from a range of A Levels and BTECs.

References

External links

Secondary schools in the Borough of Bedford
Kempston
Academies in the Borough of Bedford